The Game of Scouting is a Canadian informational television series which aired on CBC Television in 1967.

Premise
The series was produced to commemorate the 60th anniversary of the Boy Scouts movement. Each episode featured a scout troop who would demonstrate various outdoors skills such as constructing a rope bridge across a ravine, filling a backpack for overnight hike or using topographical maps.

Scheduling
This half-hour series was broadcast on Thursdays at 5:30 p.m. (Eastern) from 6 July to 28 September 1967.

References

External links
 

CBC Television original programming
1967 Canadian television series debuts
1967 Canadian television series endings
Television shows filmed in Edmonton